Legislative elections were held in France on 11 September 1819, during the Second Restoration, to choose delegates to the French Chamber of Deputies. It was the third of three elections (the others coming in 1817 and 1818) under a new law that called for legislative elections to be held annually in one-fifth of the nation's departments.  

For the third straight election, the Liberals (left-opposition) made a strong showing, picking up 35 seats. The election of Grégoire caused a scandal, as he was a famous member of the Convention, which forced the government of Decazes to cancel this election. Nevertheless, the liberal group represented nearly one-third of the Lower House after this partial election, whereas the Ultras were reduced to 30 MPs.

References

Legislative elections in France
France
Legislative
France